1847 in sports describes the year's events in world sport.

Baseball
Events
 Army of occupation plays baseball in Santa Barbara, California, alienating the local people.

Boxing
Events
 William Thompson retains the Championship of England but there is no record of any fights involving him in 1847.

Cricket
Events
 William Clarke's All-England Eleven (AEE), formed in 1846, becomes a major attraction and plays numerous matches throughout England
England
 Most runs – Nicholas Felix 591 @ 28.14 (HS 113)
 Most wickets – William Hillyer 134 @ 16.15 (BB 8–?)

Football
Events
 Another set of public school rules is created at Harrow which, like Eton, plays the "dribbling game".

Horse racing
England
 Grand National – Mathew
 1,000 Guineas Stakes – Clementina 
 2,000 Guineas Stakes – Conyngham
 The Derby – Cossack
 The Oaks – Miami 
 St. Leger Stakes – Van Tromp

Rowing
The Boat Race
 The Oxford and Cambridge Boat Race is not held this year

References

 
Sports by year